Gold and Copper is a 2010 Iranian film directed by Homayoon Asadian that premiered at the 2010 Fajr International Film Festival.

Plot
Seyed Reza is a young student came to Tehran to sit in the class of a famous theological teacher. After a while, his wife developed Multiple sclerosis and he got some trouble to pay.

Awards
Negar Javaherian won the award for Best Actress at the Fajr International Film Festival.

References

External links
 

2010s Persian-language films
Iranian drama films
Films about multiple sclerosis